Wickberg is a surname. Notable people with the surname include:

Erik Wickberg (1904–1996), Swedish Salvationist
 (1909–2002), Finnish architect, professor of architecture, and editor-in-chief
Håkan Wickberg (1943–2009), Swedish ice hockey player